Parkavonear Castle is a 13th-century Anglo-Norman ruin in Aghadoe in Ireland, overlooking the lakes of Killarney. It was built following the Anglo-Norman invasion of Ireland in 1169.

It is two stories high, and, unusually, is built to a cylindrical design rather than the more common rectangular shape for Norman castles.  The walls are two metres thick, and the internal floor space is several metres wide.  There is a staircase within the wall joining the two floors.  An entrance has been made into the lower floor, but originally the only entry would have been to the higher floor, enabling the occupants to pull in the ladder in time of attack.
Only the stone parts of the structure remain, as the wooden floors and roof have deteriorated and been removed.

Square earthworks surrounded the keep but only traces of them remain.

Parkavonear Castle takes its name from the Irish paírc an mhóinéir, meaning field of the meadow. It is sometimes spelt Parkvonear, but local spelling includes the middle letter 'a'.

See also
 Office of Public Works information plaque at the site

References
 

Castles in County Kerry
Ruins in the Republic of Ireland
National Monuments in County Kerry